Nintendo Fallacy is the third extended play (EP) by British indie rock band The Crocketts. Produced by the band with Dave Murder, Bird & Bush and Gareth Parton, the EP features six previously unreleased tracks and was released on 25 October 1999 by Blue Dog Records in conjunction with V2 Records. "Mrs Playing Dead" was later featured on the band's second full-length album, The Great Brain Robbery, released in 2000.

Promotion
In promotion of Nintendo Fallacy, the band toured between October and November 1999, performing in a number of major cities in England and Scotland with support acts Ruby Cruiser and Liberty 37.

Track listing

Personnel
The Crocketts
Davey MacManus ("Davey Crockett") – vocals, guitar, production on tracks 3, 4, 5 and 6
Dan Harris ("Dan Boone") – guitar, production on tracks 3, 4, 5 and 6
Richard Carter ("Rich Wurzel") – bass, production on tracks 3, 4, 5 and 6
Owen Hopkin ("Owen Cash") – drums, production on tracks 3, 4, 5 and 6

Guest musicians
Robert Samuel – trumpet on track 3

Production
Dave Murder – production and mixing on tracks 3, 5 and 6
Bird & Bush – production on tracks 1 and 2, mixing on track 2
Gareth Parton – production on track 4
Charlie Francis – mixing on track 1

References

1999 EPs
The Crocketts albums
V2 Records EPs